Antonio Bergosa y Jordán (born 1748 in Jaca) was a Spanish clergyman and bishop for the Roman Catholic Archdiocese of Antequera, Oaxaca. He was ordained in 1773. He was appointed bishop in 1801. He died in 1819. He later became Archbishop of Tarragona.

References 

1748 births
1819 deaths
Spanish Roman Catholic bishops
People from Jaca